Emma Zapletalová (born 24 March 2000) is a Slovak athlete, who specializes in 400 metres hurdles and 400 metres. She represented Slovakia at the 2018 World Junior Championships in Tampere. Zapletalová is the reigning European U23 Champion at the 400m hurdles.

Career
On 15 July 2018 in Tampere, Zapletalová took fifth place in the 400 m hurdles at the World U20 Championships. Afterwards, she had to interrupt her career for several months due to mononucleosis.

On 2 August 2020, she won the 400 m hurdles in Budapest with a time of 56.19 seconds, thus improving her personal best by almost seven tenths and smashing previous Slovak record. On 30 August in Trnava, Zapletalová improved by exactly one second, setting new national record in 55.19 sec.

In June 2021, at the FBK Games in Hengelo, Netherlands, she qualified for the delayed 2020 Tokyo Olympics in the 400m hurdles, running 55.29. Zapletalová took almost one second off her previous national record to win a gold medal at the European U23 Championships in July, where she clocked 54.28 sec.

Achievements

Circuit top results
 Diamond League meetings
 2020 (400 m h): Rome Golden Gala 7th
 2021 (400 m h): Gateshead 1 4th, Meeting de Paris 6th
 World Athletics Continental Tour meetings
 2020 Gold (400 m h): Gyulai István Memorial 5th, (300 m h) Golden Spike Ostrava 2nd
 2021 Gold (400 m h): Golden Spike Ostrava 4th, FBK Games 4th
 2021 Silver (400 m h): Šamorín P-T-S Meeting 2nd

Personal Bests

References

External links
 

Living people
2000 births
Slovak female hurdlers
Sportspeople from Nitra
Athletes (track and field) at the 2020 Summer Olympics
Olympic athletes of Slovakia